List of air bases, airfields and other facilities of the Portuguese Air Force (PoAF) and of the Portuguese Army's former aviation service.

The Air Force gives different designations to its aviation installations depending on their size, capabilities and roles:
 Air Base (BA)
 Base Airfield (AB)
 Maneuvers Airfield (AM)
 Transit Airfield (AT)

Air bases

Auxiliary airfields

See also 
 Portuguese Air Force
 Portuguese Army
 Portuguese Naval Aviation
 Portuguese Armed Forces
 Portuguese Colonial War
 Azores Air Zone Command
 List of aircraft of the Portuguese Air Force
 List of Portuguese Air Force aircraft squadrons
 Aviation in the Azores
 Portuguese Army Light Aviation Unit
 Portuguese military aircraft serials

Notes

References 
 

 
Lists of military air bases
 
Air Force bases
Air Force bases
Air forces-related lists
Military of Portugal